Get On Da Mic is a video game for the PlayStation 2 published by Eidos and co-developed by Canadian studio A2M and Highway 1 Productions. Unlike the many other singing games available for the PlayStation 2, this game focuses exclusively on hip hop songs.

The game is based on karaoke singing in which an amateur singer sings a popular song while it plays with the vocals. The games are able to detect the pitch of the singer's voice and award points based on how well the singer matches the pitches they are supposed to be singing.

Get On Da Mic requires the use of the same kinds of microphones also used with the Karaoke Revolution games. A hand-held karaoke microphone made by Logitech is available in a bundle with the game and is also sold separately; Logitech also sells a microphone headset.

The Xbox and GameCube versions were planned, but they were scrapped for unknown reasons.

Reception

The game received "generally unfavorable reviews" according to the review aggregation website Metacritic.

See also
 Karaoke Revolution
 SingStar
 Def Jam Rapstar

References

External links
 Official Website 1
 Official Website 2
 

2004 video games
Behaviour Interactive games
Cancelled GameCube games
Cancelled Xbox games
Karaoke video games
Music video games
PlayStation 2 games
PlayStation 2-only games
Video games developed in Canada
Video games scored by Andy Armer